Nazrul Islam is a masculine given name of Arabic origin meaning vow to Islam. Notable bearers of the name include:

 Kazi Nazrul Islam (1899–1976), Bengali poet, musician and revolutionary
 Syed Nazrul Islam (1925–1975), Bangladeshi politician
 Nazrul Islam (born 1929), Amir of Tablighi Jamaat Pakistan
 Chashi Nazrul Islam (1941–2015), Bangladeshi film director and producer
 Jamal Nazrul Islam (1939–2013), Bangladeshi physicist, mathematician and astronomer
 S. M. Nazrul Islam, Bangladeshi engineering academic
 Nazrul Islam Khan, Bangladeshi politician
 Nazrul Islam Khan, Bangladeshi film director 
 Nazrul Islam (politician), Bangladeshi politician
 M. M. Nazrul Islam, Bangladeshi academic and politician

